Everina Johanna Borst (1888-1943, known as Moeder Sarov, married name Ruth Sarphatie) was a Belgian radio personality. She was known as "Mother Sarov" for her children's broadcasts on the radio station  (SAROV) in the 1930s. And was a member of the Jewish Ladies Auxiliary of Antwerp. And a nurse in the local hospital. 

Everina Borst was born on 18 January 1888 at Kraliningen near to Rotterdam in The Netherlands and married Gabriël Sarphatie, a Jewish diamond merchant, on 4 October 1917, taking the name Ruth Sarphatie after gioer. In 1923 they moved to the  area of Ekeren, Antwerp. On 8 September 1942 their home was raided by the Waffen-SS, and Everina Borst and her husband were arrested. She was beaten and tortured by the SS. They brought Gabriel Sarphatie to the 'Dossin Kazerne' at Mechelen where he was sent with convoy X to Auschwitz on 15 September 1942; Everina Borst died of her injuries six months later, on 31 March 1943. She was buried in the cemetery at Brasschaat, and in 1946 was reburied with a monument bearing the inscription "Doodgemarteld voor de democratie" ("Tortured to death for democracy").

On 14 September 1944 the Volksgazet published an article titled "Moeder Sarov" werd langzaam vermoord ("Mother Sarov" was slowly killed).

A street in Sint-Mariaburg has been named Moeder Sarov-straat in her honour.

she was also the foster parent of Rabbi Friedrich see the book 'By the Hand of Hashem': https://www.feldheim.com/by-the-hand-of-hashem

References
6.  Rabbi Yaakov Friedrich (2020). "By The Hand of Hashem: (in Englis) page 5-8: and page 112: book: 

1888 births
1943 deaths
Belgian radio presenters
Belgian women radio presenters
People from Ekeren
Belgian people who died in the Holocaust
Belgian people executed by Nazi Germany
People executed by torture